The 2013 IIHF Challenge Cup of Asia was the 6th IIHF Challenge Cup of Asia, an annual international ice hockey tournament held by the International Ice Hockey Federation (IIHF). It took place between 16 March and 24 March 2013 in Bangkok, Thailand. The Chinese Taipei won the tournament after defeating Hong Kong in the final and Mongolia finished in third after defeating Kuwait in the bronze medal match. The defending champions, the United Emirates were knocked out of the playoff round in the quarterfinals by Hong Kong.

Overview
The 2013 IIHF Challenge Cup of Asia began on 16 March 2013 in Bangkok, Thailand. The tournament was split into two groups of five for the preliminary round, with both groups competing in a round robin format. Group A consists of Chinese Taipei, Kuwait, Malaysia, Thailand and the United Arab Emirates. While Group B is made up of Hong Kong, India, Macau, Mongolia and Singapore. After the preliminary round all five teams from Group A enter the quarterfinals along with the top three teams from Group B.

Chinese Taipei won the tournament after they defeated Hong Kong 4–2 in the final, claiming their third IIHF Challenge Cup of Asia title. Mongolia finished third after winning the bronze medal game against Kuwait. Khaled Al Suwaidi of the United Arab Emirates was named the tournament's top goaltender by the IIHF directorate. Thai Likit Neimwann was named the top defenceman and Ban Kin Loke of Malaysia was selected as the top forward. Jasper Tang of Hong Kong finished the tournament as the top scorer with 19 points including nine goals and ten assists. Chinese Taipei's Ting Pang-Keng was the leading goaltender based on save percentage with a percentage of 0.937.

Group stage

Group A

All times local. (UTC+7:00)

Group B

All times local. (UTC+7:00)

Playoff round

Bracket

Quarter-finals
All times local. (UTC+7:00)

Semifinals
All times local. (UTC+7:00)

Bronze medal game
Time is local. (UTC+7:00)

Gold medal game
Time is local. (UTC+7:00)

Statistics

Scoring leaders
List shows the top ten skaters sorted by points, then goals, assists, and the lower penalties in minutes.

Leading goaltenders
Only the top goaltenders, based on save percentage, who have played at least 40% of their team's minutes are included in this list.

References

External links
International Ice Hockey Federation

Chal
2013 in Thai sport
IIHF Challenge Cups of Asia
International sports competitions hosted by Thailand